Rafael Quevedo Flores has been the Peruvian Minister of Agriculture under President Alan García since September 2010.

References

Living people
Government ministers of Peru
Year of birth missing (living people)